Heritage marketing is a form of marketing that uses a medium that leverages the heritage of nations, companies and sports clubs.

Examples 
 Museums, such as BMW Museum
 Heritage edition goods, including Coca-Cola
 Anniversary goods such as foundation 100th anniversary jersey or throwback jersey

References 

Marketing by medium
Marketing by target group
Cultural heritage